Residential education, broadly defined, is a pre-college education provided in an environment where students both live and learn outside their family homes.  Some typical forms of residential education include boarding schools, preparatory schools, orphanages, children and youth villages, residential academies, military schools and, most recently, residential charter schools.

References
 Flint, Anthony, "Boarding School Approach to Youths At Risk Questioned", Boston Globe, August 16, 1993.
 Goldsmith, Heidi, "The Renaissance of Residential Education in the U.S." Conference Summary, October 2000.

External links
 CORE: the Coalition for Residential Education Washington, DC Metropolitan Area

School types
Total institutions